The 1972 Atlantic hurricane season was a significantly below average season, having only seven named storms, four fully tropical storms (the fewest since 1930) and three subtropical storms. It officially began on June 1, 1972, and lasted until November 30, 1972. These dates conventionally delimit the period of each year when most tropical cyclones form in the Atlantic basin. The first storm, Subtropical Storm Alpha, developed on May 23 off the Southeast United States and struck Florida, causing minor damage and two fatalities. Although several other tropical depressions developed, only Tropical Depression Five is known to have affected land.

The most significant storm of the season was Hurricane Agnes, which at the time was the costliest United States hurricane, until Frederic in 1979. After brushing the western tip of Cuba, the hurricane made landfall on the Florida Panhandle. It caused at least $2.1 billion (1972 USD) in damage and 137 fatalities, mostly from inland flooding in Pennsylvania and New York. The strongest hurricane of the season was Betty, which reached peak winds of  while west of the Azores. Tropical Storm Carrie passed just offshore of Massachusetts, causing heavy rainfall and resulting in four fatalities, but leaving only $1.78 million in damage.

The remaining tropical systems – Dawn, Charlie, and Delta – caused no significant effects on land. A strong El Niño kept hurricane activity at a minimum, with only four tropical storms, three subtropical storms, and three hurricanes. It was also one of only five hurricane seasons since 1944 to have no major hurricanes – the other years being 1968, the 1986, 1994, and 2013. In addition, the season was the first to name subtropical storms, using the Phonetic Alphabet, rather than the standard naming list. Collectively, the storms of the 1972 Atlantic hurricane season resulted in 137 deaths and over $2.1 billion in damage.


Season summary 

The Atlantic hurricane season officially began on June 1, 1972. Although 19 tropical cyclones developed, only seven of were named, below the 1950-2000 average of 9.6 named storms per season. Of the seven tropical or subtropical storms, three of them strengthened into a hurricane, which is also below average. None of the three hurricane became major hurricanes, which is Category 3 or greater on the Saffir–Simpson hurricane wind scale. Overall, the season was inactive, despite having a similar number of tropical waves as the previous season. The lack of activity was attributed to an El Niño – which causes below normal sea surface temperatures over the eastern Atlantic – and strong vertical wind shear. One subtropical storm and two hurricanes made landfall during the season and caused at least 137 fatalities and more than $2.1 billion in damage. The last storm of the season, Subtropical Storm Delta, became extratropical on November 7, about 23 days before the official end of hurricane season on November 30.

Tropical cyclogenesis first occurred in the month of May, with the development of Subtropical Storm Alpha. The month of June featured three tropical cyclones, including Hurricane Agnes and two tropical depressions. Three more systems formed in July, though all of them failed to reach tropical storm status. August was the most active month of the season, with five systems, including Hurricane Betty, Tropical Storm Carrie, and three tropical depressions. September featured slightly less cyclogenesis, with Hurricane Dawn, Subtropical Storm Charlie, and two tropical depressions. An additional three tropical depressions formed in October. Subtropical Storm Delta was the sole system in November, lasting from November 1 to November 7.

The season's activity was reflected with an Accumulated Cyclone Energy (ACE) rating of 36,  the lowest value since 1962. Broadly speaking, ACE is a measure of the power of a tropical or subtropical storm multiplied by the length of time it existed. Therefore, a storm with a longer duration, such as Betty, will have high values of ACE. Accordingly, tropical depressions are not included here. After the storm has dissipated, typically after the end of the season, the NHC reexamines the data, and produces a final report on each storm. These revisions can lead to a revised ACE total either upward or downward compared to the operational value.

Systems

Subtropical Storm Alpha 

A subtropical depression developed from a cold-core low pressure area southeast of the Carolinas on May 23. After initially moving northeastward, it turned sharply southward on May 26 due to a building ridge of high pressure. Later that day, the system strengthened into Subtropical Storm Alpha and proceeded to move toward the coast of Georgia. Alpha weakened to a subtropical depression and dissipated after entering the northeastern Gulf of Mexico on May 29.

Rough seas generated by the storm resulted in two people drowning in Florida and halted work to deepen a harbor at the Mayport Naval Station in Jacksonville. Wind gusts reached  on Saint Simons Island. The winds knocked down trees and power lines, leaving some people without power in eastern Georgia. Damage was minor but widespread in the state, estimated at over $50,000. Moderate rains spread in coastal areas from South Carolina through southern Florida. North Carolina also experienced about $50,000 in damage, mostly due to erosion. Alpha was the first named subtropical storm.

Hurricane Agnes 

A polar front and an upper trough over the Yucatán Peninsula spawned a tropical depression on June 14. The storm emerged into the western Caribbean Sea on June 15, and by the following day, it strengthened into Tropical Storm Agnes. The storm curved northward and brushed western Cuba on June 17. Agnes continued to intensify, and on June 18, it was upgraded to a hurricane. Minimal fluctuations in intensity occurred before the storm made landfall near Panama City, Florida, on June 19. After moving inland, Agnes rapidly weakened and was only a tropical depression when it entered Georgia. Thereafter, weakening slowed as the storm crossed over Georgia and into South Carolina. However, while over eastern North Carolina on June 21, Agnes re-strengthened into a tropical storm, as a result of baroclinic activity. Early the following day, the storm emerged into the Atlantic Ocean before re-curving northwestward and making landfall near New York City as a strong tropical storm. Agnes quickly merged with a non-tropical low pressure system on June 23.

Heavy rainfall occurred in western Cuba, causing flooding that destroyed 97 houses, isolated a few cities, and flatted crops in low-lying areas. The storm left seven fatalities. Agnes caused a significant tornado outbreak, with at least 26 confirmed twisters, 24 of them in Florida and the other two in Georgia. The tornadoes alone resulted in over $4.5 million in damage and six fatalities. At least 2,082 structures in Florida suffered either major damage or were destroyed. About 1,355 other dwellings experienced minor losses. Though Agnes made landfall as a hurricane, no hurricane-force winds were reported. Abnormally high tides resulted in extensive damage, especially between Apalachicola and Cedar Key. The storm left nine deaths and approximately $40 million in damage in Florida. Generally minor effects were also recorded in the states of Alabama, Delaware, Georgia, Ohio, South Carolina, and Tennessee, as well as the New England region. However, one fatality was reported in Delaware and three were recorded in Georgia.

The most significant effects, by far, occurred in Pennsylvania, mostly due to severe flooding. More than 100,000 people were forced to leave their homes due to flooding. In the state of Pennsylvania, more than 3,000 businesses and 68,000 homes were destroyed, leaving at least 220,000 people homeless. Agnes remains one of the worst natural disasters in Pennsylvania. New York also suffered severe damage. Similarly, rivers in the state crested high, including the Allegheny, Chemung, Genesee, Susquehanna, and Tioga rivers. Corning, Elmira, and Olean, as well as many other Southern Tier towns, were severely flooded. Throughout New York, 32,832 homes were damaged and 628 others were damaged. A total of 1,547 small businesses were extensively damaged or demolished. In Canada, a mobile home was toppled, killing two people. Overall, Agnes caused 131 fatalities and over $2.1 billion in damage.

Hurricane Betty (Bravo) 

An area of disturbed weather appeared on satellite imagery while forming within an old frontal zone on August 21. The system strengthened slowly as it headed east-northeastward or eastward and by August 24, it became Subtropical Storm Bravo. During the next 24 hours, minimal intensification occurred. However, a deepening high-level trough and a building ridge enhanced outflow and deep convection on August 25. Additionally, reconnaissance aircraft flights began indicating a transition to a warm-core. Unfavorable northwesterly winds briefly halted further development, though by late on August 26, Bravo resumed acquiring tropical characteristics after another deepening trough accelerated the storm eastward.

The hurricane then moved rapidly east-northeastward before decelerating late on the following day. Around that time, northerly winds aloft caused Betty to weaken to a Category 1 hurricane. After briefly moving southward, the storm curved back to a general westward direction and fell to tropical storm intensity on August 31.

Tropical Storm Carrie 

A complex system combining a tropical wave and an upper-level low led to the formation of a tropical depression east of Florida on August 29. It managed to become a tropical storm on August 31 and reached initial peak winds of  later that day. However, upper-level winds increased, causing Carrie to weaken to a minimal tropical storm by September 2. Due to baroclinic processes, Carrie began to re-intensify. As a result, Carrie attained its peak winds of  just prior to transitioning into an extratropical cyclone on September 3. The extratropical cyclone continued northeastward, and struck eastern Maine on September 4. By the following day, the extratropical cyclone dissipated over the Gulf of Saint Lawrence.

Carrie had a minimal impact on the East Coast south of New England, limited to increased swells, gusty winds, and light rainfall. The worst conditions occurred over southeastern New England, where wind gusts reached  and rainfall exceeded . Damage was most severe along and slightly inland from the coast. Thousands of people became stranded on offshore islands of Massachusetts after dangerous conditions created by the storm prompted the suspension of steamship service. Overall, damage was generally light, with total monetary losses valued at $1.78 million. Four deaths were blamed on the storm.

Hurricane Dawn 

A tropical wave, combined with an upper tropospheric trough, resulted in the development of a tropical depression near Cay Sal Bank, Bahamas, on September 5. Later that day, the depression struck Key Largo, Florida, before moving inland over the mainland of Florida. The system moved northeastward and soon re-emerged into the Atlantic. While located north of Grand Bahama on September 6, the depression intensified into Tropical Storm Dawn. On September 7, a cold low pressure developed near Cape Hatteras, North Carolina, which would influence much of Dawn's movement. Around that time, the storm strengthened into a Category 1 hurricane.

With Dawn appearing as a threat to the Mid-Atlantic, storm and gale warnings were issued from Chincoteague Inlet, Virginia, to Cape May, New Jersey, on September 8. However, the hurricane veered southeastward on September 9 and weakened to a tropical storm. By late on September 10, after the cold low pressure area relinquished influence over Dawn, the cyclone began moving westward, but continued to deteriorate. Dawn weakened to a tropical depression while well east of Georgia late on September 12. The system approached the Sea Islands on September 13, but curved northeastward and remained offshore. The storm also produced very light rainfall in Georgia and South Carolina.

Subtropical Storm Charlie 

Initially, the storm moved north-northeastward and strengthened into Subtropical Storm Charlie early the following day. It then moved quickly northeastward and continued to strengthen. Early on September 22, the extratropical cyclone dissipated over the far north Atlantic.

Subtropical Storm Delta 

After forming, the system soon strengthened and was upgraded to Subtropical Storm Delta. Around that time, the subtropical storm briefly moved southward, before beginning a general eastward movement on November 4. Delta soon began to weaken and was reduced to a subtropical depression by the following day. It continued eastward until November 6, at which time the storm decelerated and curved northward.

Other systems 

In addition to the named storms, there were several weak depressions during the season. It moved northeastward and headed toward the island. The depression dissipated later the following day. The next system, numbered Tropical Depression Five, developed offshore North Florida on July 10. Moving generally northward, Tropical Depression Five made landfall near Cape Fear in North Carolina on July 12. The depression dissipated over Virginia about two days later. Generally light rainfall was reported in several states, though  of precipitation was recorded on Cedar Island, North Carolina. It trekked slowly until July 19, at which time the system curved northeastward.

A tropical depression developed over Senegal on August 5. Tracking westward, the depression passed south of Cape Verde before dissipating southwest of the islands on August 8. The tenth tropical depression formed on August 16 while offshore Senegal. Moving generally westward, the cyclone crossed through Cape Verde and struck the islands of Fogo and Santiago. By August 18, the depression dissipated. The storm tracked generally westward, but then began moving west-northwestward on September 21.

The depression moved generally westward, before curving to the northwest on October 8. Five days later, it turned northward while well northeast of the Lesser Antilles. By October 14, the system began moving north-northeast. Initially the depression moved generally west-northwestward and dissipated about halfway between Barbados and Cape Verde.

Storm names 
The following names were used for named storms that formed in the North Atlantic in 1972. Storms were named Agnes, Betty and Dawn for the first time in 1972.

Subtropical storm names 
The following names were used for subtropical storms (sometimes called neutercanes) in the Atlantic basin for this year. This year was the first year to use the NATO phonetic alphabet for these storms.

*Same system.

Retirement 

The name Agnes was later retired.

Season effects 
This is a table of the storms in 1972 and their landfall(s), if any. Deaths in parentheses are additional and indirect (an example of an indirect death would be a traffic accident), but are still storm-related. Damage and deaths include totals while the storm was extratropical or a wave or low.

|-
| Alpha ||  || bgcolor=#| || ||  || Southeastern United States ||  ||  ||
|-
| Agnes ||  || bgcolor=#| ||  ||  || Yucatán Peninsula, western Cuba, Eastern United States, Canada ||  ||  ||
|-
| Unnumbered ||  || bgcolor=#| || || Unknown ||  ||  ||  ||
|-
| Unnumbered ||  || bgcolor=#| || || Unknown || North Carolina ||  ||  ||
|-
| Unnumbered ||  || bgcolor=#| || || Unknown ||  ||  ||  ||
|-
| Unnumbered ||  || bgcolor=#| || || Unknown ||  ||  ||  ||
|-
| Unnumbered ||  || bgcolor=#| || || Unknown || Senegal ||  ||  ||
|-
| Unnumbered ||  || bgcolor=#| || || Unknown ||  ||  ||  ||
|-
| Unnumbered ||  || bgcolor=#| || || Unknown || Cape Verde Islands ||  ||  ||
|-
| Betty (Bravo) ||  || bgcolor=#| ||  ||  ||  ||  ||  ||
|-
| Carrie ||  || bgcolor=#| || ||  || Northeastern United States ||  ||  ||
|-
| Unnumbered ||  || bgcolor=#| || || Unknown ||  ||  ||  ||
|-
| Dawn ||  || bgcolor=#| ||  ||  || Southeastern United States, Mid-Atlantic United States ||  ||  ||
|-
| Charlie ||  || bgcolor=#| || ||  ||  ||  ||  ||
|-
| Unnumbered ||  || bgcolor=#| || || Unknown ||  ||  ||  ||
|-
| Unnumbered ||  || bgcolor=#| || || Unknown ||  ||  ||  ||
|-
| Unnumbered ||  || bgcolor=#| || || Unknown ||  ||  ||  ||
|-
| Unnumbered ||  || bgcolor=#| || || Unknown ||  ||  ||  ||
|-
| Delta ||  || bgcolor=#| || ||  ||  ||  ||  ||
|-

See also 

 List of Atlantic hurricanes
 Atlantic hurricane season
 1971–72 South Pacific cyclone season
 1971–72 South-West Indian Ocean cyclone season 
 1971–72 Australian region cyclone season
 1972 Pacific hurricane season
 1972 Pacific typhoon season
 1972 North Indian Ocean cyclone season
 1972–73 South Pacific cyclone season
 1972–73 South-West Indian Ocean cyclone season 
 1972–73 Australian region cyclone season
 Southern Hemisphere tropical cyclone seasons: 1971–72, 1972–73

Notes

References

External links 
 WPC rainfall pages for 1972 Tropical Cyclones
 Monthly Weather Review